Dirty Three is an Australian instrumental rock band, consisting of Warren Ellis (violin and bass guitar), Mick Turner (electric and bass guitars) and Jim White (drums), which formed in 1992. Their 1996 album Horse Stories was voted by Rolling Stone as one of the top three albums of the year. Two of their albums have peaked into the top 50 on the ARIA Albums Chart, Ocean Songs (1998) and Toward the Low Sun (2012). During their career they have spent much of their time overseas when not performing together. Turner is based in Melbourne, White lives in New York, and Ellis in Paris. Australian rock music historian Ian McFarlane described them as providing a "rumbling, dynamic sound incorporated open-ended, improvisational, electric rock ... minus the jazz-rock histrionics". In October 2010, Ocean Songs was listed in the book 100 Best Australian Albums.

History

Dirty Three formed as an instrumental rock trio in Melbourne in 1992 with Warren Ellis on violin and bass guitar (ex-These Future Kings in 1986), Mick Turner on lead and bass guitars (Sick Things, The Moodists, Venom P. Stinger, Fungus Brains), and Jim White on drums (People with Chairs Up Their Noses, Feral Dinosaurs, Venom P. Stinger). Prior to the formation of Dirty Three, Ellis studied classical violin, worked briefly as a school teacher in regional Victoria, then travelled as a busker in Europe. Ellis wrote music for theatre groups and plays before performing with Melbourne bands. Ellis was also a member of The Blackeyed Susans, Busload of Faith, Kim Salmon and the Surrealists and has been a member of Nick Cave and the Bad Seeds since 1994. Turner and White have a shared musical history via numerous common bands during the 1980s and early 1990s. Outside Dirty Three's activities, both have since contributed to other artists and groups. White's previous group Feral Dinosaurs also featured Conway Savage, also a member of Nick Cave and the Bad Seeds and The Blackeyed Susans. White also played on records by Hunters and Collectors and Tex, Don and Charlie.

On ANZAC Day (25 April) 1992, Dirty Three played their first gig—at the Baker's Arms Hotel, Richmond. At the trio's first live show, Ellis attached a guitar pick-up to his violin with a rubber band, providing the instrument with a distorted, feedback-drenched tone unlike the violin's more traditional sound. In 1992, they recorded a self-titled cassette of 12-tracks in Turner's bedroom (aka Scuzz Studio). Dirty Three played all over Melbourne's inner city in Abbotsford, then Fitzroy, Richmond and St. Kilda. In 1993 copies of the Dirty Three cassette were given away at their early gigs. During 1994 they were the support act for international groups Pavement, Beastie Boys and John Spencer Blues Explosion. In July that year, Torn & Frayed Records issued the band's eponymous album. According to Australian rock music historian Ian McFarlane, it was "[b]rimming with Ellis's alternately subtle and dramatic violin flourishes, Turner's tensile guitar lines and White's sympathetic drumming, [and] was a strong introduction to the band's atmospheric musical palate".

In November 1994 their next album, Sad & Dangerous, was issued on the Poon Village label and included tracks from the trio's earlier cassette. The album, along with subsequent tours with Sonic Youth, John Cale, and Pavement, led to a record deal with Chicago's Touch and Go Records. In March 1995 the group started a United States tour with a gig in San Francisco. In May they performed at the Music West Festival in Vancouver, British Columbia, Canada. Subsequently, that year they toured the US four times, then toured Europe with gigs in Greece, Germany and the United Kingdom. They toured Israel with Nick Cave and the Bad Seeds, then back in London in August they performed with Cave – who was also a participant on the Palace project – providing a live soundtrack for the Carl Dreyer silent film The Passion of Joan of Arc, at the National Film Theatre.

They performed at the Big Day Out series of concerts in January 1996 – for the Melbourne show they were joined on stage by Cave. Later in 1996 they toured the US again; one of the shows was at Maxwell's, New Jersey. In September that year they issued their next album, Horse Stories, which was voted by Rolling Stone magazine as one of the top three albums of the year. In March 1998 the band issued Ocean Songs, which Billboards Chris Morris felt was "an unexpected new direction" where "the sound is still brazenly live, the atmosphere is generally rapturous and lyrical, instead of explosive and febrile". The album peaked in the top 50 on the ARIA Albums Chart. In October 2010 Ocean Songs was listed in the book 100 Best Australian Albums. It was described as displaying "an Australian sound that had never been heard before, one that was aware of our vast landscape but was reared in the urban landscapes of our various inner-city underground scenes". In May 1998 they started a two-month US tour. The group provided five new tracks for the soundtrack of John Curran's debut feature film Praise (1998).

In March 2000 Dirty Three released another studio album, Whatever You Love, You Are which McFarlane found showed "deep, rich, emotional musical vistas, and furthered the band's connection to the music and approach of jazz great John Coltrane". In 2002, Dirty Three toured Taiwan together with US indie rocker Chan Marshall (aka Cat Power) and both artists returned in 2004. Also in 2004, they gigged at the Meredith Music Festival where a rain storm threatened their set, Ellis later remembered "we just went out and played like our lives depended on it ... and you all went for it; otherwise it just fell to pieces". In late 2005, Dirty Three released their seventh major album, Cinder. Although following in the spirit of Ocean Songs, it diverges from their previous works: it was their first album to feature vocals (from Marshall and from Sally Timms of The Mekons), albeit on two of nineteen tracks. Its tracks are generally shorter and more concise; and instead of their usual live-in-the-studio technique they recorded each member's work individually.

In 2006 they toured Malaysia, Hong Kong, China and Taiwan. In May 2007 the band curated a weekend of the All Tomorrow's Parties festival, booking bands they admired in addition to performing twice themselves. In November they issued a two-disk DVD set, The Dirty Three; the first disc shows a live concert from Tokyo, Japan, shot in HD by Taiyo Films, and the second disc contains various live performances from 1994 to 2006, a documentary and interviews. Film director Darcy Maine completed the documentary on the band's history. In February 2012 the group released Toward the Low Sun, and in March, they performed at the Sydney Opera House. The album peaked in the top 40 on the ARIA Albums Chart and appeared in the top 50 on Billboards Top Heatseekers Chart.

Collaborations
Since 1996 Dirty Three's violinist Warren Ellis has been a member of Nick Cave and the Bad Seeds. Ellis and Mick Turner have each released solo albums. In addition, Turner and Jim White have released several extended plays as The Tren Brothers, and appear as backing musicians on albums by Cat Power, Bonnie 'Prince' Billy and PJ Harvey (White drums). Turner is also an internationally exhibited painter with his own work gracing the covers of their major albums except Sad & Dangerous. He also runs the band's own record label, Anchor & Hope Records. In 1999, Dirty Three with Low, recorded an In the Fishtank session for Konkurrent Records.

Dirty Three have released albums on Touch & Go Records and have toured with Nick Cave, Sonic Youth, Low, Pavement, Throwing Muses, Cat Power, PJ Harvey, Bonnie 'Prince' Billy, Devendra Banhart, Josh T. Pearson, Shannon Wright and The Pogues. During their career the group have spent much of their time overseas, when not performing together Turner is based in Melbourne, White lives in New York, and Ellis in Paris.

Style
Australian rock music historian Ian McFarlane compared the band to 1970s jazz rockers MacKenzie Theory, writing that the group's "rumbling, dynamic sound incorporated open-ended, improvisational, electric rock ... minus the jazz-rock histrionics". In describing the group's sound, music journalists have mentioned ballads, folk, rock, classical, chamber music, free jazz and blues, Celtic music, other European folk styles and Indian raga.

Discography

According to various sources:

Studio albums

Live albums

Video albums

Extended plays

Awards and nominations

ARIA Awards
The ARIA Music Awards are presented annually from 1987 by the Australian Recording Industry Association (ARIA). Dirty Three have won one award from four nominations.

|-
| rowspan="2" | 1997 || rowspan="2" | Horse Stories || ARIA Award for Best Independent Release ||  
|-
| ARIA Award for Best Adult Alternative Album ||  
|-
| 1998 || Ocean Songs || Best Adult Alternative Album ||  
|-
| 2000 || Whatever You Love, You Are || Best Adult Alternative Album ||  
|-

EG Awards
The EG Awards are an annual awards night celebrating Victorian music.  They commenced in 2006.

|-
| rowspan="2"| EG Awards of 2012
| Toward the Low Sun
| Best Album 
| 
|-
| themselves
| Best Band
|

References

General
  Note: Archived [on-line] copy has limited functionality.
Specific

External links

 

Victoria (Australia) musical groups
ARIA Award winners
Musical groups established in 1992
Australian musical trios
Australian post-rock groups
Touch and Go Records artists
Instrumental rock musical groups
Bella Union artists
Rough Trade Records artists
Drag City (record label) artists